Bouchercon is an annual convention of creators and devotees of mystery and detective fiction. It is named in honour of writer, reviewer, and editor Anthony Boucher; also the inspiration for the Anthony Awards, which have been issued at the convention since 1986. This page details Bouchercon XXIX and the 13th Anthony Awards ceremony.

Bouchercon
The convention was held in Philadelphia, Pennsylvania on October 1, 1998; running until the 4th. The event was chaired by Deen Kogan, founder of the Society Hill playhouse.

Special Guests
American Guest of Honor — Carl Hiaasen
International Guest of Honor — Janwillem van de Wetering
Media Guest of Honor — Tom Fontana
Fan Guest of Honor — Hal Rice and Sonya Rice
Distinguished Contribution — Ruth Cavin
Toastmaster — Jonathan Gash

Anthony Awards
The following list details the awards distributed at the thirteenth annual Anthony Awards ceremony.

Novel award
Winner:
S. J. Rozan, No Colder Place

Shortlist:
Anthony Bruno, Devil's Food
Earl Emerson, Deception Pass
Arturo Pérez-Reverte, The Club Dumas
James Sallis, Eye of the Cricket

First novel award
Winner:
Lee Child, Killing Floor

Shortlist:
Grace Edward, If I Should Die
Maureen Jennings, Except the Dying
Philip Reed, Bird Dog
Robert Skinner, Skin Deep, Blood Red

Paperback original award
Winner:
Rick Riordan, Big Red Tequila

Shortlist:
Laura Lippman, Charm City
Sujata Massey, The Salaryman's Wife
Martin J. Smith, Time Release
K.J.A. Wishnia, 23 Shades of Black

Short story award
Winners:
Jan Grape, "A Front Row Seat", from Vengeance is Hers
Edward D. Hoch, "One Bag of Coconuts", from Ellery Queen's Mystery Magazine November 1997

Shortlist:
Simon Brett, "Ways to Kill a Cat", from Malice Domestic 6
James DeFilippi, "A Fog of Many Colors", from New Mystery summer 1997
James S. Dorr, "Paper Boxes", from New Mystery summer 1997

Cover art award
Winner:
Michael Kellner; for Kent Anderson, Night Dogs

Shortlist:
Krystyna Skalski; for G. M. Ford, The Bum's Rush
Doug Fraser; for K. C. Constantine, Family Values
Gail Cross; for Jane Rubino, Fruitcake
Victor Weaver; for Laurence Shames, Virgin Heat

References

Anthony Awards
29
1998 in Pennsylvania